Haer may refer to:

Haer, Senegal, a village in the Bignona Department of Senegal
Haer, Punjab, a village in Punjab, India
Haier, a Chinese electronics firm
HAER, the Historic American Engineering Record